Olivia Rogowska was the defending champion, however she chose not to participate.

Daria Gavrilova won the title, defeating Tereza Mrdeža in the final, 6–1, 6–2.

Seeds

Main draw

Finals

Top half

Bottom half

References 
 Main draw

Launceston Tennis International
Launceston Tennis International - Singles
2015 in Australian tennis